Nomius pygmaeus, known generally as the stink beetle or stinking beetle, is a species of ground beetle in the family Carabidae. It is found in North America, Europe, Africa, and temperate Asia.

References

Further reading

External links

 

Psydrinae
Articles created by Qbugbot
Beetles described in 1831